Dear Superstar are a hard rock band from Manchester, UK. They incorporate very modern styles of rock and metal with the swagger of old 1980s hair metal.
They have had an extensive international touring history with many sold out shows across the UK and Europe. They have played on the same bills as acts such as Bullet for My Valentine, Papa Roach, Buckcherry, Guns N' Roses and Mötley Crüe – helping to build upon their foundations as one of the UK’s brightest hard rock groups. New Musical Express Magazine has described them as:

"A quintet reeking of cheap leather and dirty liquor… Slickly produced gargantuan riffs, mixed with squealing solos, growls, cackles and power drums!"

Band members

The band consists of: 
                
Micky Satiar - Vocalist.
Adam Smethurst - Lead Guitarist.
 Nic Roe - Drummer.
Stew Milton - Rhythm Guitarist.
Stephen Kilpatrick - Bassist.

Albums & Touring

They have released three albums: the first being Confessions of a Twisted Mind (2006), their second Heartless (2008) produced by Romesh Dodangoda and Damned Religion (2012) which was produced by David Jones in Manchester and mixed by Bob Marlette in Los Angeles, a document of years of touring and a graphic confession of the band's lifestyle of unbridled mayhem.

The band sparked a unique relationship with rock independent label DR2 Records who went on to release Heartless, in October 2008. For this album they recruited bassist Chris Hodgson.

Dear Superstar toured in support of Heartless in 2009 supporting Papa Roach on the sold-out tour, were quickly confirmed to appear at the Download Festival 2009 which was swiftly followed by a tour with Buckcherry culminating in an end-of-tour appearance at the Sonisphere festival.

They have also since completed a double-legged tour over winter 2009/2010 with Heavens Basement, a first headline tour during summer 2010, and have supported bands such as Guns N Roses, Motley Crue, Limp Bizkit and Buckcherry.

Their first single was "Live Love Lie" which has been made available on Spotify. "Live Love Lie" featured Bullet for My Valentine's bassist and backing vocalist Jason James, who screamed in the song. Their second single was "Brothers in Blood". Both songs have music videos and have been played on the likes of Scuzz and Kerrang.

They started recording Damned Religion in the summer of 2010, at their own studios (Superstar Studios, Bury) and mixed by legendary rock producer Bob Marlette in Los Angeles. The album was released in February 2012. This album is the follow-up to Heartless.

First single from Damned Religion was Our City Sleeps which featured Buckcherry guitarist Steve Dacanay. The music video was played internationally on all major Rock and Metal TV channels and radio stations, including Kerrang TV, MTV and BBC Radio One.

Original bass player and original drummer left Dear Superstar after the band took a long term hiatus in 2012.

Stephen Kilpatrick and Nic Roe joined the band in 2018.

References

Musical groups from Manchester
English hard rock musical groups